Zhou Jianren (1888–1984) was a politician and biologist of the People's Republic of China. He was the younger brother of Lu Xun and Zhou Zuoren.  When the office of the Chairman of the Standing Committee of the National People's Congress was vacant in 1976, Zhou was one of the 20 vice chairmen who administered the position.  He also served as the chairman of China Association for Promoting Democracy and the governor of Zhejiang Province.  He was a member of the 10th and 11th Central Committees of the Chinese Communist Party.

A popular article in textbook of Chinese primary schools, "My Uncle, Mr. Lu Xun", was written by Zhou Ye, daughter of Zhou Jianren.

References

1888 births
1984 deaths
Writers from Shaoxing
Academic staff of Shanghai University
Academic staff of Jinan University
Academic staff of Anhui University
Educators from Shaoxing
Republic of China translators
People's Republic of China translators
People's Republic of China politicians from Zhejiang
Governors of Zhejiang
Politicians from Shaoxing
Members of the China Association for Promoting Democracy
Members of the China Democratic League
20th-century Chinese translators
19th-century Chinese translators
Lu Xun
Chinese Communist Party politicians from Zhejiang
Vice Chairpersons of the National People's Congress
Vice Chairpersons of the National Committee of the Chinese People's Political Consultative Conference